Onboardly is a digital marketing service that offers public relations and content marketing services to startup companies. .Onboardly is owned and operated under DropDesk, a technology platform that helps business professionals find affordable workspace.

History 
Onboardly was originally founded in July 2012 by Renée Warren and Heather Carson. Before Onboardly, Warren was the CEO and co-founder of another digital marketing agency, Carson ran her own PR consultancy. Warren and Carson came together to establish Onboardly as a PR and marketing agency for small, and medium-sized companies, along with startups.

As of May 2020, Onboardly now operates under DropDesk's marketing subsidiary providing startups and real-estate alike with top tier public relations, content marketing, social media, and influencer marketing through the initial launch phase, initial customer acquisition phase or during high growth phases. The company is based on Long Island, the United States, and other parts of the world.

References

External links 

Coworking space providers
Marketing companies